R. M. Lodha (born 28 September 1949) is a former Chief Justice of the Supreme Court of India. Before being elevated to the Supreme Court, he served as the chief justice of Patna High Court. He has also served as a judge in Rajasthan High Court and Bombay High Court. On 14 July 2015, the Supreme Court committee headed by RM Lodha suspended the owners of Rajasthan Royals and Chennai Super Kings from the Indian Premier League cricket tournament for a period of two years for alleged involvement in betting.

Early life
Rajendra Mal Lodha was born in an Oswal Jain family to Justice S K Mal Lodha, a former Judge of Rajasthan High Court. He was born in Jodhpur, Rajasthan. He completed his BSc and LLB at the Jodhpur University.

Career
In February 1973, he enrolled with the Bar Council of Rajasthan at Jodhpur. He moved to Jaipur in 1977 on formation of Jaipur Bench of the Rajasthan High Court. He was appointed Central Government standing counsel at the Rajasthan High Court in 1990. On 31 January 1994, Lodha was elevated as a permanent judge of Rajasthan High Court at Jodhpur. On 16 February 1994, he was transferred to Bombay High Court and served till 2007. He resumed office as a judge of Rajasthan High Court on 2 February 2007. On 13 May 2008, he was elevated as the Chief Justice of the Patna High Court. 

Lodha was appointed the Chief Justice of India succeeding P Sathasivam on 11 April and assumed charge on 27 April 2014. Justice Lodha said that infusing greater transparency in the appointment of judges and initiating steps to bring down the backlog of 33,000,000 cases will be among his priorities.

Other positions held
These include:
 Chairman, State Judicial Academy, Rajasthan
 Executive Chairman, National Legal Services Authority
 Chairman, General Council, Gujarat National Law University, Gandhinagar
 President, Supreme Court Middle Income Group Legal Aid Society
 Chairperson, Advisory Committee, National Court Management Systems
 Chancellor, National Law School of India University, Bengaluru
 Chancellor, West Bengal National University of Juridical Sciences, Kolkata
 Chancellor, Chanakya National Law University, Patna

Further reading

References

External links

 Profile page for Chief Justice of India Hon'ble Mr. Justice RM Lodha

1949 births
Living people
20th-century Indian judges
20th-century Indian lawyers
21st-century Indian judges
21st-century Indian lawyers
Chief justices of India
Chief Justices of the Patna High Court
Indian Jains
Judges of the Bombay High Court
Judges of the Rajasthan High Court
Justices of the Supreme Court of India
People from Jodhpur
Rajasthani people